Lac Gagnon Water Aerodrome  was located on Lac Gagnon, Quebec, Canada, and was open from May until November.

References

See also
Mont-Tremblant/Lac Duhamel Water Aerodrome

Defunct seaplane bases in Quebec
Airports in Laurentides